Haunted Changi,  is a 2010 Singaporean found footage horror film directed by Andrew Lau. The film gained attetion online prior to its release due to online marketing.

Plot
Film-makers Andrew, Sheena and Farid enter the abandoned Changi Hospital to film a documentary film on the supposed paranormal happenings that occur in the hospital.

Cast
 Sheena Chung
 Andrew Lau
 Farid Azlam

Release
The film was released in theatres on 2 September 2010. It managed to earn $48,992 on the first day. It was also released in Japan. The film earned $555,833.

The film was released on DVD in December 2010, and sold 2,000 copies in the first four days.

Reception
Kurt Dalhke of DVD Talk wrote a positive review of the film, writing that "Lau and crew's characterizations work fantastically, so when the camera is rushing urgently through those narrow, sickly tunnels underneath the hospital, rounding corner after blind corner on the way to who knows what, we're right there in person feeling the terror, the almost unbearable tension."

John Lui of The Straits Times gave the film three stars out of five in his review of the film, stating, "Haunted Changi takes huge chances with keeping the world of the documentary intact. There are small issues, such as the camera tracking a little too smoothly in some spots, and larger ones, such as when spooks, both computer-generated and played by actors, appear." Juliana June Rasul of The New Paper gave the film two-and-a-half stars out of five, stating, "If there is any sense of creepiness, it is provided purely by the location." Chen Yunhong of Lianhe Wanbao gave the film three stars out of five. Li Yiyun of gave the film three stars out of five for entertainment and two and a half stars out of five for art. Zheng Jingyou of My Paper gave the film two and a half stars out of five.

References

External links
 
 

2010 films
Singaporean horror films